Starlight Theatre is a 30-minute American television anthology series of romantic stories that aired on CBS from April 2, 1950, to October 4, 1951. Forty-nine episodes aired. In 1950-1951 it alternated with The George Burns and Gracie Allen Show.  

Guest stars that appeared include Mary Sinclair, Julie Harris, Barry Nelson, Eve Arden, John Forsythe,  Melvyn Douglas, Jackie Cooper, George Reeves, Jean Stapleton, and Franchot Tone.  

Among its directors were John Peyser, Yul Brynner,  Martin Ritt, Curt Conway, and Robert Stevens.

Critical response
Critic Jack Gould commended the "Welcome Home" episode for its portrayal of a radio correspondent who was thrust into celebrity status when she returned to the United States from the Far East. Gould's review in The New York Times noted that the episode's lines often seemed "awkward and contrived" and that the "direction was satisfactory".

Episodes

References

External links
Starlight Theatre at CVTA with list of episodes

1950s American anthology television series
1950 American television series debuts
1951 American television series endings
Black-and-white American television shows
CBS original programming